Futari wa Pretty Cure Splash★Star is the third Pretty Cure anime television series produced by Toei Animation. The story revolves around two girls, Saki Hyuuga and Mai Mishou, who were chosen to become Pretty Cure and guard the Fountain of the Sun from the evil Dark Fall. The series aired in Japan from February 5, 2006 to January 28, 2007, replacing Futari wa Pretty Cure Max Heart in its initial timeslot and was succeeded by Yes! PreCure 5. The opening theme for all of the episodes is "Makasete★Splash☆Star★" (まかせて★スプラッシュ☆スター★ Makasete Supurasshu Sutā?, "Leave it to Us Splash Star") by Yuka Uchiyae with Splash Stars. The ending theme used in episodes 1-30 is "'Warau ga Kachi' de GO!" (「笑うが勝ち!」でGO! "Warau ga Kachi de Gō!?, "'Laugh and Win!' GO!") by Mayumi Gojo, and the ending theme for episode 31 and onwards is "Ganbalance de Dance" (ガンバランスdeダンス Ganbaransu de Dansu?) also by Mayumi Gojo with Flappy and Choppy.


Episode list

See also
Futari wa Pretty Cure Splash Star: Tick-Tock Crisis Hanging by a Thin Thread! - An animated film based on the series.

References 

2006 Japanese television seasons
2007 Japanese television seasons
Pretty Cure episode lists

es:Anexo:Episodios de Futari wa Pretty Cure